Richard Canal (born 1953) is a French author and screenwriter in the science-fiction, fantasy, mainstream and thriller genres.

Biography 
After a PhD in Toulouse III University, he becomes a teacher-researcher in computer science. He lives for many years in Africa where he teaches artificial intelligence, multi-agent systems and genetic algorithms. There, he manages computer & mathematics departments in universities, writes and leads major projects in higher education for French Ministry of Foreign Affairs, especially in Senegal and Cameroon. When he moves to Asia, he is recruited by the Francophone University Agency (AUF) as leader of its outpost in Laos, then as headmaster of graduate institutes in Vietnam (IFI) and Tunisia (IFIC).

Richard Canal is an ardent defender of a literary science fiction with style. His first short novel appears in the magazine Fiction in April 1983. Another short novel, C.H.O.I.C.E., is crowned in 1986 with a prize annually awarded by the Quebec magazine Solaris just before Étoile receives the Grand Prix de l'Imaginaire in 1989. La malédiction de l’éphémère (1986) is his first novel. He wins the Rosny-Aîné Award two years in a row for Ombre blanche in 1994 and Aube noire in 1995, two novels in his African Trilogy.

As for thrillers, La Route de Mandalay is published in 1998. His second novel in this field, Cyberdanse macabre (1999), features an astrophysicist, Mark Sidzik, who investigates the wrongdoings of a multinational microprocessor chip manufacturer with the help of Internet hackers. Gandhara (2018) moves from a hard boiled detective style (Hammet or Chandler like) to a postmodern thriller. It tells the epic journey of a private detective from Nice to London, from Bangkok to Kabul, in a world shaken by terrorist attacks.

In Upside Down (2020), his last novel, Richard Canal signs his return to an ambitious and universal science fiction, a main revealing of the major concerns of our time.

Writings

Novel 
Science-fiction

 La Malédiction de l’Éphémère, La Découverte, 1986
 Les Ambulances du Rêve, Fleuve Noir, 1986
 La Légende Étoilée, Fleuve Noir, 1987
 Les Voix Grises du Monde Gris, Fleuve Noir, 1987
 Villes vertiges, L'Aurore, 1988
 Swap-Swap, J'ai Lu n° 2836, 1990
 La Guerre en ce Jardin, Fleuve Noir, 1991
 Ombres Blanches, J'ai Lu n° 3455, 1993
 Aube Noire, J'ai Lu n° 3669, 1994
 Le Cimetière des Papillons, J'ai Lu n° 3908, 1995
 La Malédiction de l’Éphémère (revised), J'ai Lu, 1996
 Les Paradis Piégés, J'ai Lu n° 4483, 1997
 Animamea (revised from 2,3,4), Infini sans frontière, 2003
 Deloria, Mnémos, 2006
Upside Down, Mnémos, 2020

Thriller 

 La route de Mandalay, L'Atalante, 1998
 Gandhara, Séma Editions (Belgium), 2018
L'Equilibre du mal, Séma Editions (Belgium), 2019

Mainstream 

 Cyberdanse macabre, Flammarion, 1999
 Cyberdanse macabre, France Loisir (Reedition), 2000
 L'Ombre du Che, Flammarion, 2000
Equinoxes, Evidence Editions, 2020

Short novel 

 “ Préméditation ”, Extraordinaire Magazine 3-4-5, 1982
 “ Auto-Régulation 1 ”,  Archipel n°3, 1982
 “ Auto-Régulation 2 ”,  Archipel n°4, 1982
 “ Contribution à l’étude des répercussions névrotiques de l’univers concentrationnaire sur l’individu ”  Rivages n°10, 1983
 “ Deux Silhouettes sur un Mur de Gaufrettes ”,  Fiction n°339, 1983
 “ Ne me quitte pas ”,  Espaces Libres n°13,  July – September, 1983
 “ Divertissement tragique ”, Edition Michel Ruf SF livre poche n°2, 1983
 “ Radiation Blues ”,  Rock & Folk  200,  September 1983
 “ Te souviens-tu de Rosa ? ”, Vopaliec n°54 bis, September 1983
 “ Autorégulation ”, A&A n°86, September 1983
 “ Le cœur Fracassé ”, Fiction n°345, November 1983
 “ Les Risques du Métier ”, Fiction n°348, February 1984
 “ Un si Joli Puits ”, Fiction n°350, April 1984
 “ Le Passé comme une Corde autour de notre Cou ”, Fiction Spécial Francophonie n°355 Bis, August 1984
 “ Tentation ”, Français d’Afrique n°11, July 1985
 “ Ton Linceul sera de Sable ”, Proxima n° 8, 4th quarter 1985
 “ Délivrance ”, Catalogue Librairie Ailleurs n°9, October 1985
 “ Flèche d’Azur ”, La Vie du Rail n°2055, July1986
 “ C.H.O.I.X. ”,  Solaris n°68, July August 1986
 “ Le Dernier Village ”, Espaces Imaginaires n°4,  4th quarter 1986
 “ Le Sentier de la Désolation ”, Imagine n°36, October 1986
 “ Comme un gosse qui entend craquer le monde ”, 10 Ans d’Ailleurs, November 1986
 “ Étoile ”, J’ai Lu Univers n°88, 1988
 “ C.H.O.I.X. ”, Proxima n°4, 1988
 “ Les Risques du métier ”,  La frontière éclatée / Grande anthologie de la S.F./ Edition Le Livre de Poche, November 1989
 “ Sur les Rives de la Mémoire ”, Phénix n°21, April 1990
 “ Mille Soleils ”, J’ai Lu Univers n°90, June 1990
 “ Hurlements ”, Atelier du Gué Brèves n°33-34, July 1990
 “ Le lac des cygnes ”, Phénix n°23, August 1990
 “ Petit Paul, Petit Jean et mon Oncle ”, Phénix n°26, February 1991
 “ Villedieu ” coécrit avec J.C. Dunyach, Solaris n°97, May June 1991
 “ Crever les yeux de Dieu ”, Denoël Territoires de l’Inquiétude n°7,1993
 “ Vers l’Éternelle Grisaille ”, L’Encrier Renversé n°20, Spring 1995
 “ Les heureux damnés ”, J’ai Lu Anthologie Genèses, 1996
 “ Les grenats et les anges ”,  Atelier du Gué Brèves n°52, April 1997
 “ HTTP://WWW.CS.Starsong ”, Galaxies Spécial, March 1998
 “ Dernier embarquement pour Cythère ”, Fleuve Noir Anthologie Escales sur l’horizon, April 1998
 “ Retour au Paradis ”, Libération, December 1998
 “ Le souffleur de rêves ” coécrit avec Noé Gaillard, Fleuve Noir Anthologie Fantasy, January 1999
 “ Potemkine ”, Solaris Numéro spécial international 127, 1999
 “ Les Aelhomin ”, coécrit avec Alexis Ulrich, Phénix n° Spécial 50, March 1999
 “ Souvenirs d’un SpiritKiller ”, Le Soir (Bruxelles), March 1999
 “ Gorée “, Terres des Ecrivains Site Web, August 1999
 “ Moi, le maudit ”, Orion Editions Anthologie Privés de Futur, February 2000
 “ L’homme lourd ”, Festival de Montmorillon 2000, June 2000
 “ Ton linceul sera de sable ”, Fleuve Noir Anthologie Royaumes, June 2000
 “ Le souffleur de rêves ” coécrit avec Noé Gaillard, Naturellement Anthologie Forces Obscures, October 2000
 “ Souvenirs d'un spirit killer ”, Nouvelle Donne n° 22, October 2000
 “ Délire psycho ”, Phénix n°66, January 2002
 “ Mille soleils ”, Naturellement  Anthologie Les enfants du Mirage/Les chefs-d’œuvre de la SF française 1980-1990, May 2002
 “ Les enfants du Chaos ", Mnemos Anthologie Icares 2004, November 2003
 “ Ukiyo-e ”, Revue Imagine, Décember 2004
 “ Le secret de Mme Hargreaves ”, Mnemos Anthologie Alice, January 2005
 " L’enfant du futur " Anthologie Elric, Fleuve Noir, 2007
" Le choeur malade ", with Noé Gaillard, Galaxies-SF, n° 62, December 2019

Awards 

 Solaris Award in 1986 for "C.H.O.I.X"
 Grand prix de l'Imaginaire Award in 1989 for "Étoile"
 Rosny-Aîné award in 1994 for "Ombres blanches" and in 1995 for "Aube noire"

References

External links
Richard Canal page 

1953 births
French science fiction writers
Living people
French male novelists
Paul Sabatier University alumni